November Rain is a 2007 Indian Malayalam-language film,  directed by Vinu Joseph. The film stars Arun, Sajeevan, Aniyappan and Geetha in lead roles. The film had musical score by Anup S. Nair.

Plot
Sathyanarayan is the son of Krishnamoorthy and Indira. Krishnamoorthy is a police officer and he wants his son to get educated well. Sathya joins the college after his schooling. He disregards his dad's wishes and gets into the company of baddies and in the course of time, he becomes their hero. In search of quick money, they plan to rob a bank. Majeed Ali alias Alikka, the real villain tries to wipe out Sathya and his mates. He creates problems at times for Sathya. Sathya loves Anu and marries her against his and her parents' approval. Eventually Sathya's father commits suicide. Whether Sathya destroys his enemies and comes out victorious and leads a normal life. The aftermath is narrated in the later part.

Cast

Arun as Sathyanarayan
Sajeevan
Aniyappan
Geetha as Indira, Sathya's mother
Lalu Alex as Krishnamoorthy, Sathya's father
Nimisha Suresh as Anu. Sathya' love interest
Niyaz Musaliyar
Reji Nair
Daniel Balaji as Majeed Ali
Sadiq as Peter
Sajitha Betti as Archana, Sathya's Sister 
Samad
Spadikam George
Sreejith Ravi
Vinod Kovoor

Soundtrack
The music was composed by Anup S Nair.

References

External links
 

2007 films
2000s Malayalam-language films